Marsabit is a town in the northern Marsabit County in Kenya. It is situated in the former Eastern Province and is almost surrounded by the Marsabit National Park. It serves as the capital of Marsabit County, and lies southeast of the Chalbi Desert in a forested area known for its volcanoes and crater lakes and others.

Overview
Marsabit is an outpost of urban civilization in the desert of northern Kenya. The town is situated on an isolated extinct volcano, Mount Marsabit, which rises almost a kilometer above the desert. The hills here are heavily forested, in contrast to the desert beyond, with their own "insular" eco-system. The town has a population of about 5,000.

The town is mainly inhabited by the Cushitic-speaking the Rendille- an Afro Somaloid speaking ethnic community, the Borana Oromo people, Gabra, Sakuye and Dasenach.There are also very few Nilotic Turkana and Bantu Ameru residents. Additionally, there are also few non-Cushitic-speaking traders.

Marsabit has an airstrip and a mountain peak (Mount Marsabit), with "singing" wells just outside the town. Elephants can also often be seen in the local wildlife refuge that surrounds the town, occasionally breaking down fences and causing damage to local farmers' crop beds.

The name is possibly from the Amharic word 'Marsa bet' (Meaning Marsa's home/house) and is believed to have been named after a farmer named 'Marsa' (ethnically Burji) who was brought to Marsabit from Mega (in Ethiopia) by the Consul to assist in consolidation of farming and permanent settlement on the slopes of Mount Marsabit. However, Colonial explorers occasionally  interacted with locals, the herdsmen to point to the mountains on their expedition while in the lowlands. The Cushitic speaking Rendille of Marsabit pronounce the place as indication of dark clouds engulfing the top peak of the mountains, thus Mar-sabich. ‘Mar’is a rainy/drizzling clouds, sabich is engulfing. In addition the same communities also at some point refer first explorers to have named the place; Mar-a-bit. This is an olden English word; Mar means (impair the quality or appearance of; foggy/ hazzy) describing higher cold altitude.
(Mar:a:bit). The mountains nature are engulfed and mar a bit with dark clouds and this is where when locals could interact with explorers when ask where they came from, they in return reply pointing to the dark mountains Mar-a-bit.

On the other hand, it is claimed that "Marsa" was a governor and was sent there by Emperor Haile Selassie of Ethiopia at that time when the area was part of Ethiopia. The castle on the top of the hill on the outskirt of the town is believed to be where Governor Marsa lived (Muktar Osman Shumbe-Oromo historian).

Culture and religion

Besides the aforementioned ethnic groups, there are other people from other parts of Kenya who are there working mostly for the government and business. Muslims, Christians and adherents of traditional religions all inhabit the town.

Marsabit was the announced location for a conference between Borana and Gabra elders scheduled for 2–6 June 2009. Discussions to resolve existing conflicts between the two groups have been underway for several years now, and agreements were expected to be sealed at the event at this conference in the presence of traditional leaders.

Transport

Reaching the town formerly required private transport, but there are now several bus services on the route from Isiolo to Marsabit, and from Nairobi to Moyale via Marsabit. The road is tarmac to bitumen standards and connects to the Kenya-Ethiopia Border at Moyale.

There are two airstrips servicing charter aircraft, one close to town on the road towards Moyale (Marsabit Airstrip), and the second further away towards Chalbi (Segel Airstrip). The Mission Aviation Fellowship (MAF) operates the only regular flight to Marsabit, on Tuesdays and Fridays.

Economy

Marsabit town is a trading and commercial centre, which facilitates the supply and movement of goods and services between Moyale (goods from Ethiopia) and Isiolo (goods from Nairobi). Agriculture also plays a role, as many grow millet and maize to be consumed locally and nomadic people supply beef by selling their cows.

Lake Paradise (which attracts game animals such as elephants and buffalo), and Bongole Crater located in the heart of the forest are both local attractions for tourists. The town and surrounding area are of rich cultural interest to anthropologists and other researchers.

Climate
Marsabit has an altitude-influenced dry-summer tropical savanna climate (Köppen: As), very slightly above the hot semi-arid climate (BSh) found in nearby lowlands.

References

External links
Marsabit - coordinates

Populated places in Marsabit County
County capitals in Kenya